French Haitians, also called Franco-Haitians are citizens of Haiti of full or partial French ancestry. The term is sometimes also applied to Haitians who migrated to France in the 20th and 21st century and who have acquired French citizenship, as well to their descendants.

Colonization 

The story begins with the issuing of French adventurers in the Tortuga Island, which was close to the Spanish colony of Santo Domingo. As a result in the late 17th century, the French had de facto control of the island close to the Spanish colony. The wars of Louis XIV of France in Europe finally convinced the Spaniards to give the island to the French under to the Treaty on Ryswick (1697). The French called their new colony Saint-Domingue. And they began transforming the settlement into a large sugar plantation. Later the Frenchmen began to bring large numbers of African slaves to work on plantations, the destruction of the Taino and African imports changed the demographics of St Domingue. By the late 17th century, the French made up 90% of the nation, with more than 1,000 settlers and their descendants (note that Haiti had a European past), but as the number of black people grew faster, they acceded to a mix between French and black people, which resulted in a fast growth of mulattos, although in some cases the mixing occurred two or more times. The French could notice that some mulatto were clearer than others. By the early 18th century, mulattos and slaves started to compose the majority of the colony, blacks continued to be used as slaves for the production of sugar, which was in demand in Western Europe. That made the French put much pressure and cruelty to blacks to speed the production.

Haitian massacres and slave revolt 

For 1791, the first revolt of slaves and mulattos got up, which consisted blacks demanded their rights, to abandon slavery, and equal skin color, this fault with indignation in Paris and whites in Saint-Domingue the white man lynched blacks and mulattos that fell into their hands, no matter their gender or age. Then another stood up to 1804, this time led by the slaves: Toussaint Louverture and Jean-Jacques Dessalines, but this what slaves joined and massacred in a brutal form to whites who lived in the colony, as well as their descendants in that colony. This produced a notable reduction of French people in Haiti.

Notable French Haitians 

 Joseph Bunel
 Charles Frédéric Chassériau
 Marie-Madeleine Lachenais
 Josaphat-Robert Large
 Jean-Louis Michel

See also 

 France–Haiti relations
 White Haitians

References

European Haitian
 
Ethnic groups in Haiti
Haiti